John William Oscar Stone (1909-1955) was a male athlete who competed for England.

Athletics career
He competed for England in the 440 yards hurdles at the 1934 British Empire Games in London.

References

1909 births
1955 deaths
English male hurdlers
Athletes (track and field) at the 1934 British Empire Games
Commonwealth Games competitors for England